The 2022 BNP Paribas Primrose Bordeaux was a professional tennis tournament played on clay courts. It was the 13th edition of the tournament and part of the 2022 ATP Challenger Tour. It took place in Bordeaux, France between 9 and 15 May 2022.

Singles main-draw entrants

Seeds

 1 Rankings are as of 2 May 2022.

Other entrants
The following players received wildcards into the singles main draw:
  Arthur Fils
  Hugo Grenier
  Lucas Pouille

The following players received entry into the singles main draw as special exempts:
  Grégoire Barrère
  Pavel Kotov

The following players received entry from the qualifying draw:
  Elliot Benchetrit
  Martín Cuevas
  Calvin Hemery
  João Menezes
  Andrea Pellegrino
  Pedro Sousa

The following players received entry as lucky losers:
  Kimmer Coppejans
  Ramkumar Ramanathan

Champions

Singles

 Alexei Popyrin def.  Quentin Halys 2–6, 7–6(7–5), 7–6(7–4).

Doubles

 Rafael Matos /  David Vega Hernández def.  Hugo Nys /  Jan Zieliński 6–4, 6–0.

References

2022 ATP Challenger Tour
2022
2022 in French tennis
May 2022 sports events in France